This is a list of projects, both realised and unrealised, by British-Iraqi architect Zaha Hadid.

Projects

References

Footnotes

 
Neo-futurism architecture
Hadid, Zaha